Carl Francis Poscha (20 May 1965 – 7 April 2008) was a part-time rally driver and lorry driver from Glan Conwy in Wales.

Poscha was twice married and a rally enthusiast, who travelled to Finland with his navigator Ray Hotty in August 2001 to compete in the WRC Rally Finland in a Citroën Saxo VTS. The duo's rally ended after an accident.

On 7 April 2008, Poscha committed suicide by hanging, aged 42, in a barn in Dolgellau. The inquest that was held into his death ruled a verdict of suicide.

References

External links
 WRC Results (eWRC)

Welsh rally drivers
1965 births
2008 deaths
World Rally Championship drivers
Suicides by hanging in Wales
2008 suicides